Adam (perhaps representing the name Áedán), ruled from sometime prior to 1189 as Mormaer of Angus. Almost nothing is known of him, but it is fairly certain that he was the son of Gille Brigte, the previous Mormaer. He died young and was succeeded (if they did not rule jointly) by his younger brother Gille Críst.

Bibliography
 Roberts, John L., Lost Kingdoms: Celtic Scotland in the Middle Ages, (Edinburgh, 1997), pp. 53–4

12th-century births
People from Angus, Scotland
Year of death unknown
12th-century mormaers
Mormaers of Angus